Avibrissosturmia is a genus of bristle flies in the family Tachinidae. There are about six described species in Avibrissosturmia.

Species
These six species belong to the genus Avibrissosturmia:
 Avibrissosturmia avida Townsend, 1927 c g
 Avibrissosturmia lanei Guimaraes, 1983 c g
 Avibrissosturmia lopesi Guimaraes, 1983 c g
 Avibrissosturmia nigra Guimaraes, 1983 c g
 Avibrissosturmia plaumanni Guimaraes, 1983 c g
 Avibrissosturmia vexans (Curran, 1934) c g
Data sources: i = ITIS, c = Catalogue of Life, g = GBIF, b = Bugguide.net

References

Further reading

External links

 
 

Tachinidae